The round slitshell, scientific name Gyrotoma walkeri, is an extinct species of freshwater snail, an aquatic gastropod mollusk in the family Pleuroceridae. This species was endemic to the United States.

References

Pleuroceridae
Extinct gastropods
Gastropods described in 1924
Taxonomy articles created by Polbot